Ryszard Milewski (born 4 September 1957) is a Polish footballer. He played in three matches for the Poland national football team from 1980 to 1981.

References

External links
 

1957 births
Living people
Polish footballers
Poland international footballers
Place of birth missing (living people)
Association footballers not categorized by position